Orthaga asbolaea is a species of snout moth in the genus Orthaga. It is known from Java, Indonesia.

References

Moths described in 1938
Epipaschiinae
Endemic fauna of Indonesia